Phước Long is a former province of Southeast region of Vietnam. It was established on 22 October 1956 by a presidential decree. It was one of South Vietnam's 22 provinces. It is now part of Bình Phước province. The province was originally into three districts: Phước Bình, Bù Đốp, and Phước Hòa. In 1961, it was reorganized as four districts: Bố Đức, Phước Bình, Đức Phong and Đôn Luân. The administrative center was in Phước Bình.

History
 On 23 January 1959, part of Phước Long province was divided to form Phước Thành province.
 On 24 July 1961, Phước Hòa District was dissolved.
 In 1976 Phước Long province was merged with Bình Dương province and Bình Long province to form the new Sông Bé province.

Districts
 Bố Đức
 Phước Bình
 Đức Phong
 Đôn Luân

Provinces of South Vietnam
Southeast (Vietnam)